Gnoma agroides is a species of beetle in the family Cerambycidae. It was described by Thomson in 1860. It is known from Moluccas. It contains the varietas Gnoma agroides var. albovittata.

References

Lamiini
Beetles described in 1860